William Ackerman (born November 16, 1949) is an American guitarist and record producer who founded Windham Hill Records.

Career

Early years
Ackerman was born in Palo Alto, California. His adoptive father was a professor of English at Stanford University. He grew up in the San Francisco Bay Area and attended Northfield Mount Hermon School in western Massachusetts. He returned to Palo Alto to study English and History at Stanford University.

His life took a turn when he discovered he had a fondness for carpentry. He was five credits short of graduating when he left Stanford to work as an apprentice to a Norwegian boat builder. In 1972, he founded Windham Hill Builders in Palo Alto while playing music for Stanford theater productions and performing impromptu concerts in town.

Windham Hill Records
With money borrowed from friends, he recorded his first album, The Search of Turtle's Navel, later changed to In Search of the Turtle's Navel, on his own label, Windham Hill Records in 1976. His second album, It Takes a Year. he released in 1977.   Shortly thereafter, Will recorded and produced an album entitled Turning:Turning Back by his cousin, guitarist  Alex De Grassi.  This was followed by Robbie Basho whose music had inspired Ackerman for years.  He left carpentry to pursue music full time in 1980. During that year, the label received national attention via the success of a piano album by George Winston entitled  Autumn.   He then discovered guitarist Michael Hedges at a concert in Palo Alto and immediately signed him to the label. Other musicians in the catalog were Darol Anger, Mike Marshall, Liz Story, and the band Shadowfax. In time the genre associated with Windham Hill was called New-age music.

In 1982, A&M Records became Windham Hill's distributor. The label was selling millions of albums, and Ackerman became a wealthy man. Despite outward signs of success, he was diagnosed with depression. By 1984, Ackerman no longer wanted to run a large corporation. He left California for Vermont. He built Imaginary Road Studios in Dummerston, Vermont and has continued to work as a producer.  The walls of his studio are covered in more than 20 Gold and Platinum records from US and overseas sales.

Awards and honors
Grammy Awards
 Best New Age Album, Returning, 2004
Nominated, Best New Age Album, Brothers, 2021

Zone Music Reporter Awards
 Album of the Year, The Gathering, 2012
 Best Contemporary Instrumental Album, The Gathering, 2012
 Lifetime Achievement Award, 2013
 Album of the Year, Flow by Flow with Fiona Joy, Lawrence Blatt, and Jeff Oster, 2017
 Best Contemporary Instrumental Album, Flow by Flow with Fiona Joy, Lawrence Blatt, and Jeff Oster, 2017

Discography 
 1976: In Search of the Turtle's Navel (Windham Hill)
 1977: It Takes a Year (Windham Hill)
 1979: Childhood and Memory (Windham Hill)
 1981: Passage (Windham Hill)
 1983: Past Light (Windham Hill)
 1986: Conferring with the Moon (Windham Hill)
 1988: Imaginary Roads (Windham Hill)
 1992: The Opening of Doors (Windham Hill)
 1998: Sound of Wind Driven Rain (Windham Hill)
 2001: Hearing Voices (Windham Hill)
 2004: Returning (Decca)
 2008: Meditations (Lifescapes)
 2010: New England Roads
 2017: Flow 
2019 Flow Promise (LMB Music)
2019 Four Guitars https://www.fourguitars.com/
2021 Brothers (Retso Records) 
2022 Positano Songs (West River Records)

Compilations
 1993: A Windham Hill Retrospective (Windham Hill)
 2006: Pure Will Ackerman (Windham Hill)

See also 
List of ambient music artists

References

External links

 Innerviews, 1998
 Windham Hill Records history 1982–1989
 Airlock door at Imaginary Road Studios

1949 births
20th-century American guitarists
A&R people
American acoustic guitarists
American adoptees
20th-century American composers
American male composers
American male guitarists
Chamber jazz guitarists
Fingerstyle guitarists
German emigrants to the United States
Grammy Award winners
Living people
New-age guitarists
Northfield Mount Hermon School alumni
People from Dummerston, Vermont
Windham Hill Records artists
20th-century American male musicians
American male jazz musicians
21st-century American guitarists
21st-century American male musicians